Araeopteron pictale is a moth of the family Noctuidae first described by George Hampson in 1893. It is found in Sri Lanka.

References

Moths of Asia
Moths described in 1893
Boletobiinae
Taxa named by George Hampson